Fernando Bustamante (born 1988), known professionally as Crudo Means Raw, is an American beatmaker and rapper. Born in New York City, he lived in Long Island until age five before moving to Medellin and reached popularity in 2018 when his song "La Mitad de la Mitad" reached number one on Spotify Colombia's top songs chart.

Biography

Early life
Fernando Bustamante was born in New York City to Colombian parents who immigrated to the United States to work. He lived in Long Island before moving to Medellin, Colombia at age five to live with his mother. He began rapping in high school with his classmate J Balvin. The rapper adopted his stage name Crudo Means Raw because in his words, "that's how my music sounds, no other way to describe it. My music is raw, without hidden meanings, and the sound is organic, natural...I make music without labels, that most people can identify with. Growing up, he drew influence from New York hip-hop acts A Tribe Called Quest and Gang Starr.

Career
In 2018, his song "La Mitad de la Mitad" reached number one on Spotify Colombia's top songs chart. He made a guest appearance on the song "Aurora" from Colombian singer-songwriter Juanes' album Más Futuro Que Pasado. In December 2019, he released the R&B-influenced single "La Titular" with Colombian singer Mabiland. He released the album Esmeraldas on March 30, 2020. Elias Leight of Rolling Stone described his song "Novena" from Esmeraldas "complex and more convincing...a track like few others that have been released this year."

Discography
Amalgama beats (2012)
Voyage: El Pasaje (2015)
Todos Tienen Que Comer (2016)
Esmeraldas (2020)
La Infusión mixtape Vol. 1 (2020)
War Dog (2023)

References

1988 births
Living people
American hip hop singers
American reggaeton musicians
American male singer-songwriters
American people of Colombian descent
Latin music songwriters
People from Medellín
Urbano musicians
American singer-songwriters